Sigtryggsson may refer to:

Ánláf Sigtryggsson, 10th-century Norse-Gael who was King of Northumbria and Dublin
Guðrøðr Sigtryggsson (died 951), King of Dublin
Harald Sigtryggsson (died 940), Viking leader who ruled Limerick
Olaf Sigtryggsson, son of Sigtrygg Silkbeard, the Hiberno-Norse King of Dublin
Ragnar Sigtryggsson (1925–2009), Icelandic footballer
Rúnar Sigtryggsson (born 1972), Icelandic Olympic handball player